Calibration (Is Pushing Luck and Key Too Far) is the fifth studio album by Omar Rodríguez-López, and the fourth released in the "Amsterdam series". The album was released in Japan on December 15, 2007 with a following U.S. release later on February 5, 2008, merely a week after The Mars Volta's The Bedlam in Goliath. The album art was illustrated by graffiti artist GREY, a childhood friend of Rodriguez-Lopez's.  According to the label, the original title given to them by Omar was "Calibration Is Pushing Luck and Key Too Far" but the "Is Pushing Luck and Key Too Far" part of the title appeared nowhere on the physical release.

Track listing

Release history

Sales
Calibration was Omar's second album to chart on a Billboard music chart and his highest charting yet, peaking at #29 on the Top Heatseekers chart [].

Personnel
 Omar Rodríguez-López – guitars, bass (6–8), synthesizer (1, 3, 6–8, 11), Mexican harp (1), vocals & lyrics (2,7,8), vocals (4), Wurlitzer (3), tea kettle (3), TVs (5), rhodes (7), drum machine (7), clavinet (8)
 Juan Alderete – bass (1, 2, 4, 7, 10, 11)
 Thomas Pridgen – drums (1, 7, 11)
 Marcel Rodriguez-Lopez – drums (2, 4, 6, 8, 10), percussion (2, 6, 10), synthesizer (1, 6, 7, 11), clavinet (6)
 Adrián Terrazas-González – woodwinds & percussion (2, 10)
 Money Mark – synthesizer (2, 10)
 Cedric Bixler-Zavala – vocals & lyrics (4, 10)
 John Frusciante – vocals & lyrics (6)
 Sara Christina Gross – saxophone (7)
 Tina Rodriguez – voice (1, 6)
 Kim Humphreys – violin (2, 5, 8, 10, 11)

References

2007 albums
Omar Rodríguez-López albums
Albums produced by Omar Rodríguez-López